Jason Khalipa (born October 2, 1985 in San Jose, California) is an American former professional CrossFit Games athlete known for his accomplishments as the 2008 CrossFit Games champion.

He also received the Spirit of the Games award at the 2009 CrossFit Games and was selected to participate as a member of Team USA at the CrossFit Invitational in 2012, 2013, and 2014.

Khalipa is the founder and CEO of NCFit headquartered in Campbell, California.

Personal life
Khalipa was born in San Jose, California, and attended Archbishop Mitty High School where he played for the varsity football team as a nose guard. He also participated in track and field for the shot put event. Khalipa began his fitness career in high school by working part time as the front desk representative at Milpitas Health and Fitness, a gym in Milpitas, California. After high school, he attended college at Santa Clara University in Santa Clara, California, but he did not participate in organized sports. He continued working full-time at Milpitas Health and Fitness where he trained for his first CrossFit Games and devoted the rest of his time on his education, graduating with a Bachelors of Arts in Business Management. Khalipa opened his first gym, CrossFit Santa Clara nearly a month after winning his first CrossFit Games in 2008. Khalipa's recognition grew in the CrossFit world and wrote As Many Reps As Possible about his career. He became dedicated to learning more about health and fitness as a competitor and a coach. He renamed CrossFit Santa Clara to NorCal CrossFit in 2011 and then renamed again in 2017 to NCFit.

In January 2016, Khalipa's daughter Ava was diagnosed with leukemia. After Ava's final treatment in 2018, Khalipa and his wife Ashley have since focused on spreading awareness for pediatric cancer.

In June 2020, Khalipa announced NCFits disaffiliation from the CrossFit brand, following then-CEO Greg Glassman's controversial posts on Twitter in 2020.

Athletic career
Khalipa competed in eight CrossFit Games competitions throughout his professional career, winning his first in 2008 where he placed first. As the champion of the 2008 CrossFit Games, he automatically qualified in the 2009 CrossFit Games where he placed fifth and earned the Spirit of the Games award. From 2010 to 2015, Khalipa continued to place first in CrossFit Regional events and once during the CrossFit Open, which was a world-wide event, but he did not place first overall in another CrossFit Games. In 2015, he competed as a team member with his affiliate, NorCal CrossFit, in the team competition. He decided not to compete in the 2016 CrossFit Games to take care of his daughter following her diagnoses with Leukemia. He briefly participated in the 2017 Open, but withdrew after one event. In 2016, Khalipa began training in Brazilian Jiu Jitsu (BJJ). He placed first in the adult 208lb division of the US Open Brazilian Jiu-Jitsu at the Kaiser Permanente Arena in Santa Cruz, California, on October 23, 2016.

Training and diet
Khalipa trained three times a day for a competition. The morning workouts usually consist of aerobic training: bike, row, or run. In the afternoon, he engaged in CrossFit and he reserved the evenings for stamina building in complex skills such as handstands, muscle ups, or Olympic lifts. When Khalipa is not training to compete in CrossFit events, he maintains a regular training schedule that includes daily classes at NCFit and Brazilian Jiu Jitsu two to three days a week to maintain conditioning.

His diet differs slightly from when he trained for competitions, which was a gluten-free and mostly paleolithic diet. Khalipa replenishes calories with more food more often by eating meats and veggies, and he does not keep track of type, volume, or a macronutrient breakdown.

CrossFit Games results

Bibliography
 As Many Reps As Possible (2018)

References 

1985 births
Living people
People from San Jose, California
People from Santa Clara, California
Santa Clara University alumni
CrossFit athletes
CrossFit coaches